Messiah Mission Church, also known as Messiah Evangelical Lutheran Church, was a Lutheran church in the Inwood neighborhood of Manhattan. The congregation was founded in 1916 and a two-storey brick school and chapel was built 1926 to designs by George W. Conable 46 West 24th Street, at 198-200 Sherman Avenue. The pastor who built the 1926 school church was Frederick P. Wilhem of 609 West 204th Street. 

Messiah merged in 1945 with St. Matthew's Lutheran Church with that congregation moving into Messiah's building. Messiah's church was sold when St. Matthew's (with Messiah) moved into a newly built church at 202 Sherman Avenue, Inwood, in 1957.

References 

Dunlap, David W. From Abyssinian to Zion: A Guide to Manhattan's Houses of Worship. New York: Columbia University Press, 2004.

Lutheran churches in New York City
Churches in Manhattan
Former Lutheran churches in the United States
Christian organizations established in 1916
Churches completed in 1927
Inwood, Manhattan
1916 establishments in New York City